Steele Creek is primarily considered to be a community and neighborhood in the southwestern part of Mecklenburg County in North Carolina.  It is generally defined geographically by the original boundaries of Steele Creek Township.  Most of Steele Creek is within the city limits of Charlotte but the areas that have not yet been annexed are also recognized as a Township of North Carolina.

Population
The population of the Steele Creek community was 52,014 as of 2010, roughly two-thirds of which is now located within the City of Charlotte.

History

Early 
The Steele Creek community derives its name from the small creek bearing the same name.  It is believed that name "Steele" was the family surname of Scotch-Irish immigrants who settled in the area in the late 17th and early 18th centuries.  The region was eventually designated as Steele Creek Township,  one of the original 15 Townships of Mecklenburg County.

Modern 
In 1959, the North Carolina State Legislature revised laws that govern how cities may annex adjacent areas, allowing municipalities to annex unincorporated lands without permission of those residents.  This change in North Carolina law led to adoption of an aggressive annexation policy by the City of Charlotte, which repeatedly expanded its borders by annexing land within Steele Creek Township, which had never been formally incorporated.

Despite nearly two-thirds of Steele Creek being annexed by Charlotte, the region remained primarily rural farmland until the 2000s, when significant infrastructure improvements greatly accelerated the effects of suburban sprawl.  The widening of NC 49, the replacement of the old Buster Boyd Bridge, and the opening of I-485, spurred tremendous growth in both residential and commercial development.  Today Steele Creek is the fastest growing region of Charlotte/Mecklenburg County, with more than a 70% population boom between 2000 and 2007.

Subdivisions 
Steele Creek has several subdivisions within its area, most of which are residential. Listed here are the most notable subdivisions:
 Arrowood, a corridor of mostly commercial businesses and apartment complexes along Arrowood Road.
 Ayrsley is a mixed-use development between Westinghouse Boulevard and Interstate 485.
 Berewick, developed by Pappas Properties, is a mixed-use development between Shopton Road and Dixie River Road.
 Olde Whitehall, a corridor of mostly commercial and retail businesses along Interstate 485, between South Tryon Street and Arrowood Road.
 Palisades, a golf course community in the most southwestern part of Steele Creek, centered around the Palisades Country Club.
 Shopton, centered at intersection of Steele Creek Road and Shopton Road, is a mostly industrial zoned area.
 Yorkshire is a large residential subdivision between Choate Circle and Carowinds Boulevard.

Schools and libraries

School system
The first school in Steele Creek was founded in the 1780s. Today, Steele Creek is served by the Charlotte-Mecklenburg Schools (CMS) district. These include Olympic High, Palisades High, Kennedy Middle, Southwest Middle, Lake Wylie Elementary, Steele Creek Elementary, Winget Park Elementary, River Gate Elementary, Berewick Elementary, South Pine Academy and Palisades Park Elementary.

Libraries
Steele Creek is served by a branch of the Public Library of Charlotte and Mecklenburg County.  The library is located on Steele Creek Road in front of Southwest Middle School.

Infrastructure

Main thoroughfares

 Carowinds Boulevard
 General Paul R. Younts Expressway (I-77/US 21)  
 Seddon Rusty Goode Freeway (I-485)
 Shopton Road West
 South Tryon Street/York Road (NC 49)
 Steele Creek Road (NC 160)
 Westinghouse Boulevard

Mass transit

The Charlotte Area Transit System (CATS) offers local and express bus service in the area.

Current routes:
 16 - South Tryon: Connects between Rivergate Shopping Center and Center City.
 41X - Steele Creek Express: Connects between Rivergate Shopping Center and Center City.
 42 - Carowinds: Connects between Southpoint Business Park and I-485/South Boulevard (LYNX station).
 55 - Westinghouse: Connects between Charlotte Premium Outlets and Sharon Road West (LYNX station).
 56 - Arrowood: Connects between Charlotte Premium Outlets and Arrowood (LYNX station).

Utilities

Water and Trash pick-up is mostly serviced by the city of Charlotte, though third-party companies do service some developments in the area.  Electricity is provided by Duke Energy, which holds a monopoly.  Natural gas is provided by Piedmont Natural Gas, which holds a monopoly.  Data/Telephone/Television service is all offered by AT&T, Charter Communications, Windstream Communications, and Comporium (Ayrsley area only).

Health care

Carolinas HealthCare System Steele Creek is a healthcare pavilion that includes a 24-hour emergency department.  Patients that require long-term care are transferred to another hospital, such as Carolinas HealthCare System Pineville or Carolinas Medical Center.  Outpatient services is also available at two Urgent Care centers (Presbyterian Medical Plaza and Carolinas HealthCare Urgent Care-Steele Creek).

Compleat Rehab & Sports Therapy in the Berewick Town Center of Steele Creek offers the community access to expert physical therapists with services including physical therapy, dry needling, sports therapy and performance, and work injury recovery and prevention.

Notable residents

See also
 Charlotte, North Carolina
 Lake Wylie
 Buster Boyd Bridge

Notes

References

External links
 
 An Interactive Google Map of Steele Creek
 Steele Creek Residents Association
 Steele Creek branch of the Public Library of Charlotte and Mecklenburg County

Neighborhoods in Charlotte, North Carolina
Annexed places in North Carolina